Bradley Glen Richards (born May 2, 1980) is a Canadian former professional ice hockey centre. Richards was drafted in the third round, 64th overall, by the Tampa Bay Lightning in the 1998 NHL Entry Draft and played for the Lightning, New York Rangers, Dallas Stars, Chicago Blackhawks and Detroit Red Wings during his National Hockey League (NHL) career.

Richards is a two-time Stanley Cup champion, having won in 2004 with the Lightning, where he was awarded the Conn Smythe Trophy as the Most Valuable Player during the playoffs. He also won in 2015 as a member of the Blackhawks.

Early career
Richards was born and raised in Murray Harbour, Prince Edward Island. Since age 14, Richards has been friends with Vincent Lecavalier after they met at Athol Murray College of Notre Dame, a boarding school with a renowned hockey program in Wilcox, Saskatchewan. They were roommates and soon became good friends as they were both the youngest players on their hockey team. Since then, they went on to become teammates for the Rimouski Océanic of the Quebec Major Junior Hockey League (QMJHL) and the Tampa Bay Lightning. Lecavalier was also responsible for suggesting to Lightning management after they had drafted him to draft Richards.

In his final season with Rimouski, Richards won nearly every honour possible for a Canadian junior player in the QMJHL: he earned the Jean Béliveau Trophy after leading the QMJHL with 186 points, as well as the Telus Cup, given to the league's best offensive player; he won the QMJHL and Canadian Hockey League Plus/Minus Awards with a plus-80 mark, and was a First-Team All-Star in both the Quebec circuit and the Canadian Hockey League (CHL), as well as the CHL Player of the Year and Leading Scorer. In the post-season, Richards took home both the Guy Lafleur Trophy as MVP of the QMJHL playoffs, then the Stafford Smythe Memorial Trophy as MVP of the 2000 Memorial Cup, as the Océanic won both the QMJHL playoff title and the CHL Memorial Cup.

Playing career

Tampa Bay Lightning

Richards was drafted in the third round, 64th overall, by the Tampa Bay Lightning in the 1998 NHL Entry Draft, having recorded 82 assists and 115 points in his draft year. During that same draft, the Lightning selected Vincent Lecavalier, Richards' teammate at both the Athol Murray College of Notre Dame and Rimouski, with the first overall pick. During the 2003–04 NHL season, the Lightning would win their first Stanley Cup, with Richards' contributions during the playoffs earning him the Conn Smythe Trophy as most valuable player of the postseason, which included a record seven game-winning goals, overtaking Joe Sakic's and Joe Nieuwendyk's record of six. He also won the Lady Byng Memorial Trophy that season. Later that year, he won the World Cup of Hockey Championship playing on Team Canada.

On September 26, 2004, the Rimouski Océanic of the QMJHL retired Richards' jersey.

Richards played for Ak Bars Kazan in the Russian Superleague (RSL) during the 2004–05 NHL lockout on a team with fellow NHLers Ilya Kovalchuk, Alexei Kovalev, Vincent Lecavalier, Michael Nylander, Alexei Zhitnik, Dany Heatley and Nikolai Khabibulin. Richards also played for Team Canada at the 2006 Olympics.

After the Lightning were eliminated from the 2006 playoffs, the Lightning re-signed Richards to a five-year, US$39 million contract extension.

Dallas Stars
On February 26, 2008, roughly three hours before the NHL trade deadline, Richards was traded to the Dallas Stars in a blockbuster deal (along with goaltender Johan Holmqvist) in exchange for goaltender Mike Smith, centre Jeff Halpern, winger Jussi Jokinen and a 2009 fourth-round draft pick. Richards set the Stars' franchise record of most assists in a player's team debut game with five; the record is also a career high for Richards. In the game, Dallas defeated the Chicago Blackhawks 7–4, and Richards was named the game's first star.

In the 2008 playoffs, Richards tied an NHL record by scoring four points in a single period in a game against the San Jose Sharks.

During the 2008–09 season, Richards tallied 16 goals and 48 points in 55 games before sustaining a broken right wrist following a check from Columbus Blue Jackets forward Jakub Voráček on February 16, 2009. Richards met with a specialist the following day and missed 15 games. Richards returned to the Stars' line-up on March 21, but he then broke his other hand in the third period of Dallas' loss to San Jose. He would not return for the rest of the season, and the Stars missed the playoffs.

In the 2009–10 off-season, the team removed general managers Brett Hull and Les Jackson, who had traded for Richards, and fired head coach Dave Tippett, replacing the latter with Marc Crawford. Despite the new regime and the team's woeful finish in the standings for the second-straight season, Richards enjoyed a career year, matching a personal high with 91 points scored, playing mainly alongside Loui Eriksson and roommate James Neal. Richards finished seventh in the NHL points standings that year, just behind former Lightning teammate Martin St. Louis. He also finished fourth in the NHL in total assists and second in powerplay points. However, the Stars failed to reach 2010 playoffs. After the season, Richards was named a finalist for the Lady Byng Trophy.

New York Rangers

After becoming an unrestricted free agent, Richards signed a nine-year, $60 million contract with the New York Rangers on July 2, 2011, reuniting him with John Tortorella, his head coach from the 2004 Lightning team that won the Stanley Cup, and another member of that 2004 team, Ruslan Fedotenko. He was also approached by the Calgary Flames, Los Angeles Kings, Toronto Maple Leafs and the Tampa Bay Lightning.

On October 8, 2011, Richards scored his first goal as a Ranger in a 2–1 shootout loss to the Anaheim Ducks. The game was played at the Ericsson Globe in Stockholm. He would go on to record 25 goals along with 41 assists during his first season with the Rangers, as well as six goals and nine assists in 20 playoff games, as the Rangers were ultimately eliminated from the 2012 playoffs by the New Jersey Devils.

On April 19, 2013, Richards scored his first career NHL hat-trick in a game against the Buffalo Sabres.

On March 5, 2014, the Rangers acquired Martin St. Louis, reuniting the two, who were previously teammates when the Lightning won the cup in 2004. St. Louis and Richards both played integral roles in the Rangers' run to the 2014 Stanley Cup Finals, which they lost in five games to the Los Angeles Kings.

On June 20, 2014, the Rangers used a compliance buyout on the remaining seven years of Richards' contract in an effort to increase salary cap space. This rendered him an unrestricted free agent, and ended the brief reunion between him and St. Louis.

Chicago Blackhawks
On July 1, 2014, Richards signed a one-year, $2 million contract with the Chicago Blackhawks. He wore number 91 for the Blackhawks, the first player in team history to do so, as his usual #19 was already being worn by Blackhawks captain Jonathan Toews Richards played in his 1,000th career NHL game on November 16, 2014, against his former team, the Dallas Stars. In 76 regular season games with the Blackhawks, Richards scored 12 goals with 25 assists.

The Blackhawks, with Richards, later faced one of his former teams, the Lightning, in the 2015 Stanley Cup Finals. Chicago would prevail in six games, giving Richards his second Stanley Cup title. He assisted on Patrick Kane's late 3rd period goal in the deciding Game 6 at the United Center, sealing the victory.

Detroit Red Wings
On July 1, 2015, Richards signed a one-year, $3 million contract with the Detroit Red Wings, worth up to $4 million with playoff bonuses. With Richards' traditional #19 retired for Steve Yzerman and #91 not having been worn in Detroit by anyone since Sergei Fedorov, Richards chose to wear #17 with the Red Wings, becoming the 3rd Prince Edward Island native to wear the jersey number with the club after Forbes Kennedy in 1958-60, and Gerard Gallant in 1985-93.

The Red Wings narrowly made the playoffs for the 25th consecutive season. Richards' late-season efforts included a game-tying goal against his former Rangers teammates on March 12 with 32 seconds remaining (the Red Wings later won the game 2–1 in overtime), and a two-point game against the Toronto Maple Leafs on April 2. He'd finish the season with 10 goals and 18 assists in 68 games.

In the 2016 Stanley Cup playoffs, Richards scored one goal as the Red Wings were eliminated in five games by the Lightning in Round 1. Had the Red Wings advanced, Richards was due a $250,000 bonus with an additional $750,000 available if they had won the second round as well.

On July 20, 2016, Richards announced his retirement from professional hockey.  In a statement issued by the National Hockey League Players Association, Richards reflected on his Cup wins: "Winning the Stanley Cups in Tampa Bay and Chicago was the best part of my career and I will never forget those moments. Nothing compares to enjoying that night with your team and knowing what you have accomplished together."

Personal life
During the off-season, Richards goes back to his birthplace of Murray Harbour, Prince Edward Island.  Richards has hosted the Brad Richards PEI Celebrity Golf Classic for the past six years. The event supports two charities: Children's Wish Foundation, Prince Edward Island Chapter and Autism Society of Prince Edward Island. He is friends with Hockey Night in Canada host Ron MacLean, who spends a lot of time in PEI. During his time with the Rangers, Richards lived in an apartment in Manhattan.

Richards rented a suite at the St. Pete Times Forum (now called the Amalie Arena) for several Tampa Bay Lightning hockey games and invited families dealing with various forms of pediatric cancer to use it. After each game, he would go and visit the children who had come to watch the game. It began during the 2002–03 season and ended in 2008. When he was traded to the Dallas Stars, he continued his charity work with the Children's Medical Center's Oncology Department, supplying tickets for sick children. He also donates tickets to every home game to men and women in the military.

Richards underwent arthroscopic hip surgery on April 23, 2010, to repair a small labrum tear. In September 2010, he donated $500,000 to the Queen Elizabeth Hospital in Charlottetown, PEI.

Richards and his Australian wife Rechelle have two children. Richards speaks both English and French.

Career statistics

Regular season and playoffs

International

Awards and honors

Records
Most game-winning goals in a single playoffs seasons (7; 2004)

See also
List of NHL players with 1000 games played

References

External links

1980 births
Living people
Ak Bars Kazan players
Athol Murray College of Notre Dame alumni
Canadian expatriate ice hockey players in Russia
Canadian ice hockey centres
Chicago Blackhawks players
Conn Smythe Trophy winners
Dallas Stars players
Detroit Red Wings players
Ice hockey people from Prince Edward Island
Ice hockey players at the 2006 Winter Olympics
Lady Byng Memorial Trophy winners
National Hockey League All-Stars
New York Rangers personnel
New York Rangers players
Olympic ice hockey players of Canada
People from Kings County, Prince Edward Island
Rimouski Océanic players
Stanley Cup champions
Tampa Bay Lightning draft picks
Tampa Bay Lightning players